Jeongeup station is a KTX station in the city of Jeongeup. It is on Honam high-speed railway and the normal speed Honam Line.

External links
 Cyber station information from Korail

Railway stations in North Jeolla Province
Jeongeup
Railway stations opened in 1912
Korea Train Express stations
1912 establishments in Korea